The 2005 ITU Triathlon World Championships were held in Gamagōri, Aichi (Japan) on September 10 and September 11, 2005.

Results

Men's Championship

Women's Championship

External links
Dextro Energy Triathlon – ITU World Championship Series – Official website

References
Triathlon Database (Archived 2009-07-31)
the-sports.org
archive.triathlon.org

World Triathlon Series
World Championships
Triathlon World Championships
International sports competitions hosted by Japan
Triathlon competitions in Japan